Perfectly normal may refer to:

Perfectly Normal, a 1990 Canadian comedy film directed by Yves Simoneau
Perfectly normal space, a type of topology